Come Out and Play is the 11th studio album by British singer Kim Wilde. It was released on 27 August 2010 in Europe and is her first album with Sony Music Germany on the label Columbia SevenOne Music. The track "Lights Down Low" was released as the album's lead-single, reaching Number 34 in Germany. It included a previously unreleased song called "Snakes & Ladders". A second single called "Real Life" was released in November 2010. The album was a notable success in Germany, where it reached no. 10 on the album chart, and according to Nilsen Soundscan, was the most advertised album in the country that year.

A digital deluxe edition of the album was released in France on 7 March 2011 and includes two brand new songs as well as the "Lights Down Low" B-side. It has sold more than 80.000 Copies in Europe.

Track listing

Charts

References

2010 albums
Kim Wilde albums
Sony Music Germany albums